The ecoregions of Madagascar, as defined by the World Wildlife Fund, include seven terrestrial, five freshwater, and two marine ecoregions. Madagascar's diverse natural habitats harbour a rich fauna and flora with high levels of endemism, but most ecoregions suffer from habitat loss.

Overview

Madagascar belongs to the Afrotropical realm. With its neighboring Indian Ocean islands, it has been classified by botanist Armen Takhtajan as Madagascan Region, and in phytogeography it is the floristic phytochorion Madagascan Subkingdom in the Paleotropical Kingdom. Madagascar features very contrasting topography, climate, and geology. Consequently, the eastern belt harbours most of the humid forests, while precipitation decreases to the west. The rain shadow region in the southwest has a sub-arid climate. Geology features mainly igneous and metamorphic basement rocks, with some lava and quartzite in the central and eastern plateaus, while the western part has belts of sandstone, limestone (including the tsingy formations), and unconsolidated sand.

Terrestrial ecoregions

Seven terrestrial ecoregions are defined by the World Wildlife Fund for Madagascar. They range from the very humid eastern lowland forests to the sub-arid spiny thickets in the southwest.

Freshwater ecoregions

Freshwater ecoregions correspond to major catchment areas with a distinctive assemblage of species. In Madagascar, five ecoregions are distinguished:
 Madagascar Eastern Lowlands includes the lower humid-climate coastal plain of eastern Madagascar.
 Madagascar Eastern Highlands includes the middle and upper catchments of Madagascar's eastern coastal rivers.
 Northwestern Madagascar encompasses the westward-flowing drainage basins from the northern tip of Madagascar to the Mahavavy du Sud River, including the Mananjeba, North Mahavavy (Mahavavy du Nord), Sambirano, Ankofia, Sofia, Anjobony, Mahajamba, Betsiboka, and South Mahavavy (Mahavavy du Sud).
 Western Madagascar encompasses the drier western river basins, including the Manambolo, Tsiribihina, Mangoky, and Onilahy rivers.
 Southern Madagascar encompasses the southern drainages of Madagascar, including the Mandrare, Manambovo, Menarandra, and Linta rivers, along with Lake Tsimanampetsotsa.

Marine ecoregions

The seas around Madagascar are part of the Western Indian Ocean province in the Western Indo-Pacific realm. They are divided into two marine ecoregions:
 Southeast Madagascar
 Western and Northern Madagascar

References

 
Madagascar
ecoregions